Smolno may refer to:

Smolno, Greater Poland Voivodeship (west-central Poland)
Smolno, Kuyavian-Pomeranian Voivodeship (north-central Poland)
Smolno, Pomeranian Voivodeship (north Poland)
Smolno, Warmian-Masurian Voivodeship (north Poland)